The 1962 National Challenge Cup was the 49th edition of the USSFA's annual open soccer championship.

Final

External links
 1962 U.S. Open Cup – TheCup.us

Lamar Hunt U.S. Open Cup
U.S. Open Cup